Jaime Moreno may refer to:

 Jaime Moreno (footballer, born 1974), Bolivian footballer
 Jaime Moreno (footballer, born 1995), Nicaraguan footballer